A serial killer is typically a person who murders three or more people, with the murders taking place over more than a month and including a significant period of time between them. The Federal Bureau of Investigation (FBI) defines serial killing as "a series of two or more murders, committed as separate events, usually, but not always, by one offender acting alone".

Pre-unification

Post-unification

Unidentified serial killers

See also
 Lists of serial killers

References

Serial german
 
Serial killers